The Glamour Chase is a book in the Doctor Who New Series Adventures collection, and is the sixth novel to feature the Eleventh Doctor. It saw the reappearance of the Glamour which debuted in Ghosts of India.

Plot
An Archaeological dig in 1936 unearths relics of another time... and, as The Doctor, Amy and Rory realise, another place. Another planet. But if Enola Porter, noted adventuress, has really found evidence of an alien civilisation, how come she isn't famous? Why has Rory never heard of her? Added to that, since Amy's been traveling with him for a while now, why does she now think The Doctor is from Mars? As the ancient spaceship re-activates, the Doctor discovers that nothing and no-one can be trusted. The things that seem most real could actually be literal fabrications - and very deadly indeed. Who can the Doctor believe when no one is what they seem? And how can he defeat an enemy who can bend matter itself at its will? For the Doctor, Amy and Rory - and all of humanity - the buried secrets of the past are very much a threat to the present.

Characters
The Eleventh Doctor
Amy Pond
Rory Williams
Enola Porter
Nathaniel Porter
Oliver Marks
Daisy Conlan
Owain
Nancy Thirman

References

External links 
TARDIS Index File - The Doctor Who Wiki - The Glamour Chase

Fiction set in 1936
2010 British novels
2010 science fiction novels
Eleventh Doctor novels
New Series Adventures